Effelder-Rauenstein is a former municipality in the Sonneberg district of Thuringia, Germany. Since 1 January 2012, it is part of the municipality Frankenblick.

References

Former municipalities in Thuringia
Duchy of Saxe-Meiningen